Stony Creek is a small township in South Gippsland, Victoria, Australia, located roughly between Meeniyan and Foster.

History
The post office opened on 23 May 1892 after a settlement was established on the arrival of the railway.

The town today
Stony Creek has a horse racing club, the Stony Creek Racing Club, which schedules around seven race meetings a year including the Stony Creek Cup meeting in March.

It also has a go-kart circuit located next to the race track on the highway.

The town has an Australian Rules football team, the Stony Creek Football Netball Club, nicknamed "The Lions", competing in the Alberton Football League. The club colours are maroon and white. The club's last senior premiership came in 2009 when Stony Creek defeated Wonthaggi Power in the seniors.

See also
Stony Creek railway station, Victoria

References

External links
Township map
Stony Creek Racing Club
Stony Creek Go-Karts

Towns in Victoria (Australia)
Shire of South Gippsland